Fornix (plural fornices, Latin for "arch") can refer to:
Fornix or throat scale, a bowed prolongation of the corolla in Boraginaceae (cf.)
Fornix of the brain
Fornix conjunctiva, a part of the Conjunctiva
Fornix vaginae, also called the vaginal fornix
An early type of Roman triumphal arch